Francisco C. Álvarez (1903–1963) was a Cebuano Visayan stage actor and playwright. He was a staff member of The Freeman. He wrote a play entitled Dinagmalan, published in Bisaya in 1948.

References
www.bisaya.com Visayan Literature page—defunct

1903 births
1963 deaths
Visayan writers
Cebuano writers
Filipino writers
Cebuano people